The Battle of Boonsboro took place on July 8, 1863, in Washington County, Maryland, as part of the Retreat from Gettysburg during the Gettysburg Campaign of the American Civil War.

While Gen. Robert E. Lee's Army of Northern Virginia retreated toward Virginia following its defeat in the Battle of Gettysburg, Confederate cavalry held the South Mountain passes. The cavalry fought a rearguard action against elements of the Union 1st and 3rd Cavalry Divisions and supporting infantry. This action was one of a series of successive cavalry engagements around Boonsboro, Hagerstown, and Williamsport.

Battle
Confederate Maj. Gen. J.E.B. Stuart faced a difficult assignment—locate the Union cavalry and prevent it from severing Gen. Lee's avenue of retreat to Williamsport and the Potomac River. The result was the biggest and most sustained cavalry battle in Maryland during the campaign. The Battle of Boonsboro occurred along the National Road on Wednesday, July 8, 1863.

Stuart, with five cavalry brigades, advanced from the direction of Funkstown and Williamsport. By 11 a.m., the Confederate cavalry had pushed forward to several mud-soaked fields, where fighting on horseback was nearly impossible, forcing Stuart's troopers and Brig. Gens. H. Judson Kilpatrick's and John Buford's Union cavalry divisions to dismount and slug it out like infantry.

By mid-afternoon, the Union left under Kilpatrick crumbled as the Federals ran low on ammunition under increasing Confederate pressure. Stuart's advanced ended about 7 p.m., however, when Union infantry arrived—the first to engage in battle since Gettysburg. Stuart withdrew north to Funkstown, but he had gained another day for Lee's retreating army. Two days later, he would again delay the Federal pursuit at the Battle of Funkstown.

References
National Park Service battle description

Notes

1863 in the United States
Boonsboro
Boonsboro
Boonsboro
Boonsboro
History of Washington County, Maryland
1863 in Maryland
Boonsboro
July 1863 events